Expedition 9 (2004) was the ninth expedition to the International Space Station (21 April 2004 - 23 October 2004).

Crew

Planned crew before Columbia disaster

Mission parameters
Perigee: 384 km
Apogee: 396 km
Inclination: 51.6°
Period: 92 min

Mission objectives
Padalka and Fincke arrived at the Station on 21 April 2004 aboard the Soyuz TMA-4 spacecraft with European Space Agency (ESA) Astronaut André Kuipers. After more than a week of joint operations and handover activities, Padalka and Fincke officially took command of the Station on 29 April when Expedition 8 Commander Michael Foale and Flight Engineer Alexander Kaleri left the Station. This mission was the site for the Advanced Diagnostic Ultrasound in Microgravity Project.

Expedition 8 and Kuipers returned to Earth that same day aboard the Soyuz TMA-3 spacecraft. Kuipers' 11-day mission to the ISS was part of a commercial agreement between ESA and the Federal Space Agency of Russia.

Spacewalks
The Expedition 9 crew conducted four spacewalks during its stay at the International Space Station. The four spacewalks were devoted to ISS maintenance and assembly. All four were based out of the Pirs Docking Compartment and used Russian Orlan spacesuits.

Before these four extravehicular activities (EVAs), 52 spacewalks had been performed at the ISS, with 27 based out of the Station.

Gennady Padalka (EV1): red stripes
Mike Fincke (EV2): blue stripes

Mission patch
The design of the Expedition 9 mission patch includes a tribute to astronauts and cosmonauts who gave their lives in space exploration. The outspread wings of the eagle have 16 stars and 1 star of David. They represent the Apollo 1 crew Gus Grissom, Ed White and Roger Chaffee. Space Shuttle Challenger STS-51L crew Dick Scobee, Michael J. Smith, Ronald McNair, Ellison Onizuka, Gregory Jarvis, Judith Resnik and Christa McAuliffe. Space Shuttle Columbia STS-107 crew Rick Husband, William C. McCool, David M. Brown, Kalpana Chawla, Michael P. Anderson, Laurel Clark and Ilan Ramon, the first Israeli astronaut. Around the eagles neck are 4 small red stars and one larger red star. The large star is for Yuri Gagarin, the first man in space during Vostok 1, who was killed during training for Soyuz 3. The other 4 are for Soyuz 1 cosmonaut Vladimir Komarov, Soyuz 11 crew Georgi Dobrovolski, Viktor Patsayev and Vladislav Volkov.

References

External links

Expedition 09
2004 in spaceflight